Chicago XXV: The Christmas Album is the nineteenth studio album by the American band Chicago, their twenty-fifth overall, released in 1998 on the band's Chicago Records label. It is an album of Christmas songs. The album was re-issued by Rhino Records in 2003 as What's It Gonna Be, Santa? with six additional, newly recorded tracks.

Produced by Roy Bittan, the original album – featuring Chicago's interpretations of well-known Christmas classics plus one original tune (co-penned by Lee Loughnane) – was very well received upon its release in August 1998, peaking at #47 in the US and going gold during a stay of 7 weeks on the charts. After Chicago entered into a long-term partnership with Rhino Records in 2002, that label re-issued Chicago XXV: The Christmas Album that same year.  It was further decided to record six additional Christmas songs – with Hot Streets and Chicago 13 producer Phil Ramone – and re-issue the whole package in 2003 under a new design, title and sequencing, entitled What's It Gonna Be, Santa?, deleting its predecessor in the process. Guitarist Keith Howland sang his first lead vocal on the track, "Jolly Old Saint Nicholas".  This later release reached #102 in the US during a stay of 5 weeks on the charts.

Track listings

Chicago XXV: The Christmas Album

What's It Gonna Be, Santa?
(New additions in italic)

Personnel

Chicago 
 Bill Champlin – organ (1, 2, 4, 5, 8, 10, 14-17, 20), backing vocals (1, 2, 3, 6-14, 16, 18, 20), arrangements (1, 4, 7, 14, 17), BGV arrangements (1, 2, 6-14, 16, 20), lead vocals (4, 7, 10, 11, 14), synth keyboards (4), synth vibes (6), acoustic guitar (7), brass arrangements (7, 14), acoustic piano (10), electric piano (14, 17), computer programming (14, 17), all vocals (17), guitars (17), synth bass (17), vocal arrangements (17)
 Keith Howland – guitars (1, 2, 3, 5-8, 10, 11, 12, 14, 15, 16, 20), lead vocals (3), backing vocals (3), arrangements (3, 11), BGV arrangements (3), keyboards (11)
 Tris Imboden – drums (1-8, 10, 11, 12, 14-18, 20), arrangements (3)
 Robert Lamm – lead vocals (1, 6, 8, 15, 20), acoustic piano (1, 2, 3, 5, 7, 8, 10, 12), arrangements (1, 6, 8, 15, 20), brass arrangements (1, 8, 15), vibraphone (5), electric piano (6, 15, 16), backing vocals (3), clavinet (10)
 Lee Loughnane – trumpet (1-5, 7, 8, 10-13, 16, 17, 18, 20), flugelhorn (1, 6, 13, 14, 15, 18), lead vocals (2, 7, 12), arrangements (2, 7, 16, 18, 12), backing vocals (3, 18), muted trumpet (14), brass arrangements (17, 18), piccolo trumpet (18), BGV arrangements (18)
 James Pankow – trombone (1-8, 10-18, 20), brass arrangements (2-6, 8, 10-18, 20), synth keyboards (4), flute arrangements (9), arrangements (10, 13, 16, 19), vocal arrangements (19)
 Walter Parazaider – tenor saxophone (1-6, 8, 10-18, 20), alto flute (1, 9), alto saxophone (6, 7, 13, 14, 16), flute (6, 7, 13, 14, 16), C flute (9)
 Jason Scheff – bass (1, 2, 3, 5, 7, 8, 9, 12, 16), backing vocals (1, 2, 3, 6-14, 16, 18, 20), lead vocals (4, 5, 7, 9, 12, 13, 16), electric upright bass (4, 6, 15, 18, 20), keyboards (9), computer programming (9), arrangements (9), BGV arrangements (9, 10, 13), fretless bass (11, 14), electric bass (17)

Additional musicians 
 Roy Bittan – organ (4, 10, 18), accordion (4, 6, 18), keyboards (13), synth bells (18), acoustic piano (19)
 George Black – computer programming (9, 13, 18, 19)
 John Durill – synth keyboard (18), additional arrangements (19)
 Tim Pierce – guitars (4, 11), acoustic guitars (9, 19)
 Luis Conte – percussion (4, 6, 8, 9, 16, 20)
 Larry Klimas – baritone saxophone (3, 10)
 Nick Lane – additional arrangements (1)
 Carmen Twillie – backing vocals (6, 11, 20)

Adult choir on "The Little Drummer Boy"
 Carmen Twillie – choir director
 Alex Brown, Tamara Champlin, Alvin Chea, Gia Ciambotti, H.K. Dorsey, Gary Falcone, Edie Lehmann Boddicker, Bobbie Page, Oren Waters, Maxine Waters and Mona Lisa Young – choir 

Children's choir on "Child's Prayer" and "One Little Candle"
 Ryan Kelly – children's choir conductor
 Amity Addrisi, Michael Amezcua, Alex Bittan, Ryan Bittan, Clark Gable, Kayley Gable, Kate Lamm, Sean Lamm, Dylan Loughnane, River Loughnane, Sarah Pankow, Brittany Scott and Jade Thacker – lead vocals

Production
Chicago XXV
 Produced by Roy Bittan
 Engineered and Mixed by Ed Thacker
 Assisted by Posie Muliadi and Eric Ferguson
 Recorded at A&M Studios (Hollywood, CA); Rumbo Recorders (Canoga Park, CA); Gold Mine Studio (Woodland Hills, CA).
 Mixed at A&M Studios
 Production Coordinator – Valerie Pack
 Art Direction and Design – John Kosh

"What's It Gonna Be, Santa?"
 Produced by Phil Ramone
 Engineered and Mixed by Ed Thacker at Glenwood Place Recording Studios (Burbank, CA).
 Additional Production – Chicago and David McLees
 Sound Supervision – Lee Loughnane and Jeff Magid
 Remastered by David Donnelly at DNA Mastering (Studio City, CA).
 Product Manager – Mike Engstrom
 Discographical Annotation – Gary Peterson
 Editorial Supervision – Cory Fry
 Project Assistants – Jimmy Edwards and Tim Scanlin
 Art Direction – Hugh Brown and Linda Cobb 
 Front Cover Photo – Corbis Images
 Additional Photography – Getty Images

References

Chicago (band) albums
Rhino Records albums
Albums produced by Phil Ramone
Albums produced by Roy Bittan
1998 Christmas albums
2003 Christmas albums
Christmas albums by American artists
Rock Christmas albums